Massachusetts House of Representatives' 32nd Middlesex district in the United States is one of 160 legislative districts included in the lower house of the Massachusetts General Court. It covers part of Malden, Melrose, and part of Wakefield in Middlesex County. Democrat Kate Lipper-Garabedian has represented the district since 2020.

The current district geographic boundary overlaps with that of the Massachusetts Senate's 5th Middlesex district.

Representatives
 George Contalonis, circa 1967
 Nils Nordberg, circa 1976
 Salvatore Ciccarelli, circa 1979-1985
 John C. Bartley, circa 1990
 Warren Tolman, 1991-1995
 Rachel Kaprielian, 1995–2003
 Mike Festa, 2003-2007
 Katherine Clark, March 13, 2008 – January 5, 2011
 Paul A. Brodeur, 2011-2019
 Kate Lipper-Garabedian, 2020-current

See also
 List of Massachusetts House of Representatives elections
 List of Massachusetts General Courts
 List of former districts of the Massachusetts House of Representatives
 Other Middlesex County districts of the Massachusetts House of Representatives: 1st, 2nd, 3rd, 4th, 5th, 6th, 7th, 8th, 9th, 10th, 11th, 12th, 13th, 14th, 15th, 16th, 17th, 18th, 19th, 20th, 21st, 22nd, 23rd, 24th, 25th, 26th, 27th, 28th, 29th, 30th, 31st, 33rd, 34th, 35th, 36th, 37th

Images
Portraits of legislators

References

External links
 Ballotpedia
  (State House district information based on U.S. Census Bureau's American Community Survey).
 League of Women Voters of Melrose

House
Government of Middlesex County, Massachusetts